Prince George Youth Containment is a public high school in Prince George, British Columbia. Operated by School District 57 Prince George this program provides education to students in custody.

References

High schools in Prince George, British Columbia
Educational institutions in Canada with year of establishment missing